Fritillariidae is a family of tunicates belonging to the order Copelata.

Genera:
 Appendicularia Chamisso & Eysenhardt, 1821
 Appendicularia Fol, 1874
 Fritillaria Fol, 1872
 Tectillaria Lohmann, 1926

References

Appendicularia
Tunicate families